This is a list of airports in Costa Rica, sorted by location.

Costa Rica, officially the Republic of Costa Rica, is a country in Central America, bordered by Nicaragua to the north, Panama to the southeast, the Pacific Ocean to the west, and the Caribbean Sea to the east.

The country is divided into seven provinces, which are subdivided into 81 cantons and 463 districts. Costa Rica's capital and largest city is San José.



Airports

See also 
 Transport in Costa Rica
 List of airports by ICAO code: M#MR - Costa Rica
 Wikipedia: WikiProject Aviation/Airline destination lists: North America#Costa Rica

References
 Dirección General de Aviación Civil - Costa Rica  
 AIP Costa Rica: Part 3 Aerodromes
 
 
  – includes IATA codes
 
 

 
Costa Rica
Airports
Airports
Costa Rica